William "Will" Steven Power (born 1 March 1981) is an Australian motorsports driver who currently competes in the IndyCar Series, driving for Team Penske. He is the 2014 and 2022 IndyCar Series champion and the 2018 Indianapolis 500 champion. Power is currently fifth all-time in wins (41) and first all-time in poles (68) in IndyCar history.

Australian racing
Will Power was born in Toowoomba, Queensland. The son of open-wheel racer Bob Power, Will Power started his career in Queensland driving a Datsun 1200 at Morgan Park Raceway, Warwick as well as at Carnel Raceway, Stanthorpe. In 1999 Power began driving an aging family-owned Swift SC92F in the Queensland Formula Ford Championship, winning races in a sporadic campaign. In 2000 Power ran a full campaign leading to his first title in the Swift while simultaneously racing a late-model Spectrum 07 on the Australian Formula Ford Championship, finishing a promising seventh. Still running a small family-oriented team in 2001, Power upgraded to a Stealth RF95, a Western Australian modification of a 1995 Van Diemen. Power finished second in the series behind the factory-supported Van Diemen driver, Will Davison.

After three years of Formula Ford racing, Power moved into Formula Holden, racing for the Graham Watson-owned Ralt Australia team driving a Reynard 94D. Power swept all before him in Formula Holden, winning the title by over 50 points from Stewart McColl, claiming the 2002 Australian Drivers' Championship by winning 7 times and achieving 3 pole positions.

Midway through the 2002 season, Power was allowed to drive for the Bevan Carrick-owned Cooltemp Racing Formula 3 team, driving a Dallara-Toyota as well in the Australian Formula 3 Championship. Despite missing the opening races, Power missed out on winning the Formula 3 championship by only a handful of points to James Manderson.

Racing in Europe
Europe beckoned and in 2003 Power joined the British Formula 3 Championship racing initially for Diamond Racing, then later for Fortec Motorsport as tight funding prevented a full campaign. A second place at Thruxton demonstrated his ability and Power mounted a full campaign in 2004 with Alan Docking Racing but finished the season in the ninth position with five podium finishes.

He tested a Minardi Formula One car in 2004 with his Australian Formula Ford and British Formula 3 rival Will Davison in Italy.

During 2005 he competed in the World Series by Renault for the Carlin Motorsport team, where he proved very competitive. During the WSR championship, he scored two race victories, with 4 trips to the podium in total, and qualified his car on the front row five times. In addition to driving in the WSR, Power was also one of the featured drivers for the Australian team in the 2005–06 A1 Grand Prix season.  Power raced in the series opener at Brands Hatch and piloted Australia to a second-place finish behind Team Brazil.

Champ Car
In late 2005 Power joined Champ Car Team Australia at the Lexmark Indy 300 event at Surfers Paradise in Australia, which also resulted in his departure from the World Series by Renault championship even though that season was still in progress and Power ultimately ended seventh in the championship. In the Indy 300 Power ran strongly until being knocked off the track by teammate Alex Tagliani.  After the Surfers Paradise event, he signed a multi-year contract to race for the team, which began immediately at the next Champ Car round in Mexico City after Tagliani's teammate Marcus Marshall was released for what was described as a "serious breach of contract".

Power drove full-time for Team Australia in 2006.  He performed well throughout the season with nine top-ten finishes and strong qualifying results.  In Mexico at the final round of the season, Power took his first podium finish in Champ Car. He won the "rookie of the year" award and finished in 6th place in the championship standings.

In his home race in 2006, at Surfers Paradise in Australia, he scored the first pole position of his career in Champ Cars, in front of his home crowd. However, contact from Paul Tracy in the pit lane and then an ambitious overtaking move by Sébastien Bourdais resulted in a bent left steering arm, and he fell to the back, one lap down by the time the car was repaired, eventually finishing 12th.

On 8 April 2007, Power won his first Champ Car race at the inaugural Vegas Grand Prix, held on the streets of Las Vegas, Nevada, United States. He qualified on the pole position and led most laps, becoming the first Australian driver to win in the series. On 8 July, at the Steelback Grand Prix of Toronto, with rain pouring down and visibility near zero when he got behind other cars, Power decided it was time to get aggressive. Power drove from fourth to first in 14 laps, finally splashing past rookie Ryan Dalziel to take the lead with 23 minutes to go, and went on to an easy victory.

To get to the lead, Power also had to pass three-time Champ Car World Series champion Sébastien Bourdais and rookie Neel Jani. Thanks to a series of late caution flags, he was able to go after each of them in turn. "I was close behind Sebastien and I knew he was quite tentative in the wet and I attacked him," Power said. "I got him on a restart. Then the next restart, I got Neel and the next restart, I got Dalziel. It's just about being aggressive at the right time and not hitting anyone". "I just drove so hard here because we've just had so much bad luck in the last few races," said Power, whose first Champ Car victory came in the 2007 opener in Las Vegas. "I didn't care; I just went hard. The car was good in the wet. It was good in the dry, and we stuck it to them." Power had podium finishes at Long Beach, Mont-Tremblant, and Mexico City and pole positions at Houston, Edmonton, Surfers Paradise, and Mexico City to place fourth in the final point standings in 2007.

IndyCar

2008 season
The merger of Champ Car and the IRL left his future uncertain. Power's Walker Racing team announced they would not be making the switch from Champ Car to IRL due to a lack of sponsorship. However, Power later signed with KV Racing Technology, to drive the No. 8 Aussie Vineyards—Team Australia car in 2008, continuing to work with Team Australia boss Craig Gore.

Power won the final Champ Car race at Long Beach in 2008, also giving Power his first IndyCar Series win. He scored two top-five finishes in IndyCar Series races, enough for 12th overall, outpointed by teammate Oriol Servià. In the non-points event in Surfers' Paradise, Australia, Power won the pole position but crashed out while leading the race.

2009 season
Team Penske announced on 13 January 2009 that for the 2009 IndyCar Series season, Power would replace Hélio Castroneves at the helm of the No. 3 Team Penske Honda-Dallara while Castroneves attended to his federal tax evasion charges. Power drove the No. 3 Team Penske Honda-Dallara to a sixth-place finish in the Grand Prix of St. Petersburg, the first race of the year. Following St. Petersburg, Castroneves was acquitted of all tax evasion charges and returned to the team for the following race at the Grand Prix of Long Beach. Roger Penske came prepared for this scenario, however, and had spare cars on hand for both St. Petersburg and Long Beach, employing the option beginning at Long Beach and continuing through five more races that season. Power's new car, the No. 12 Penske Racing Verizon Wireless Honda/Dallara was officially entered for the Long Beach Grand Prix late on Friday evening and all the setup data garnered from his two sessions in the No. 3 Dallara was successfully transferred over. Power stormed to a dominant pole position with the last-minute effort and ultimately finished 2nd to Dario Franchitti after leading 16 laps. Power was also entered in the same third car for the Indianapolis 500, in which he finished in fifth place after a pit crew gaffe on the final stop – while Power was running 2nd – cost him a shot at Castroneves for the victory. To reward Power for his efforts, he was retained by the team to drive in five more races in Toronto, Edmonton, Kentucky, Sonoma, and Homestead. His team was crewed by Penske's Rolex Sports Car Series team, as Power's races were specifically scheduled on their RSCS off-weekends. Power's dreams and efforts came to fruition when he captured his first IndyCar race win, driving the No. 12, in dominant fashion at the Rexall Edmonton Indy.

Power's season was brought to an abrupt close during practice for the 2009 Motorola Indy 300 in Sonoma however, as Nelson Philippe spun exiting Turn 3 and stalled in the middle of the racing groove. As turn 3 is a completely blind corner, taken at high speed while cresting a hill, oncoming drivers had no indication there was anything over the hill and no time to react once they got there. E. J. Viso could barely avoid him, making light contact, but Power, following just behind Viso, had nowhere to go and crashed heavily into Philippe. Both drivers were airlifted from the racetrack in short order. Power had two fractured vertebrae while Philippe suffered a fractured ankle. Both drivers were concussed in the incident and were hospitalised. Both drivers' injuries would cause them to miss the rest of 2009 season.

2010 season

On 19 November 2009, Team Penske announced that Power would join the team full-time for the 2010 season with sponsorship from Verizon Wireless. Power dominantly opened the season, winning the first two races of the 2010 season at Brazil and St. Petersburg, making him the first IndyCar driver since Sam Hornish Jr. in 2001 to win the first two events of the year. He went on to win from the pole at Watkins Glen International, giving Roger Penske his first IndyCar Series win at the historic track. Over the course of the season, Power scored five wins (all on road courses) and a record eight pole positions. Power's efforts were rewarded with triumph in the Mario Andretti Road Course Championship, winning the inaugural Mario Andretti Trophy as the road course champion for the 2010 IndyCar Series season.

2011 season
During the 2011 IndyCar Series season he won 6 races; Barber Motorsports Park, São Paulo, the second doubleheader event at Texas Motor Speedway, Edmonton City Center Airport, Infineon Raceway, and the inaugural Baltimore Grand Prix. However, his season was far from easy. At Toronto he and championship leader Dario Franchitti touched in Turn 3 while battling for 5th, resulting in a spin for Power, which put him midpack where he was hit by former teammate Alex Tagliani. Power was irate with both drivers, particularly Franchitti, who with some level of controversy was not penalised for the contact and won the race.

With a few laps to go during the IndyCar Series' 225-mile return to New Hampshire Motor Speedway, amid protests from drivers and teams to not restart because of wet track conditions, the race was restarted and Power caught in the ensuing melee started by a spinning Danica Patrick. An irate Power exited his vehicle and spoke with several officials, even consulting with his race strategist Tim Cindric before displaying the finger to IndyCar director of competition Brian Barnhart. Power's immortal obscene gesture was captured on live television and met with immense support from IndyCar Series fans as well as support from members of several other team organisations in the paddock. Power's "Double Angry Birds" gesture, however, ended up landing him with a $30,000 fine, payable through public services to the league, although team owner Roger Penske said he would gladly pay the fine off. Power won the pole at the Kentucky Speedway and led the first 48 laps until he had contact with rookie Ana Beatriz as he exited his pit box.

The resulting damage relegated him to 19th place, while title rival Franchitti led the most laps, finished 2nd, and took an 18-point advantage. Power's season ended in a violent, high-speed 15-car crash at the final race of the season in Las Vegas that claimed the life of British driver Dan Wheldon. Wheldon, Power, and 3 other drivers were taken to the hospital. He lost any chance of having the points championship after the wreck, due in part to his role in the accident (his car was damaged beyond repair) and also to the fact that the race was abandoned following the wreck. Power was later diagnosed with a vertebral compression fracture in his thoracic vertebrae and had surgery to correct the problem.

2012 season
For the 2012 IndyCar Series season, Power returned to Team Penske to once again pilot the No. 12 car with teammates Castroneves and Briscoe. The road and street course heavy 2012 schedule played into Power's strength, making him one of the pre-season favorites to win the championship. After opening the season with a seventh-place finish at St. Petersburg, Power scored three consecutive victories at Barber Motorsports Park, the streets of Long Beach, and the streets of São Paulo to vault into the championship lead. Power held onto the points lead until the tenth of fifteen races when rival driver Ryan Hunter-Reay scored his third of three consecutive wins to take over the lead. Power regained the lead and built a 36-point advantage with two races remaining after strong second-place finishes at Mid-Ohio and Sonoma, coupled with two misfortunate finishes by Hunter-Reay. The season's penultimate race on the streets of Baltimore saw Power and Hunter-Reay choosing different strategies when the rain began falling.

Electing to remain on slick tires despite the wet conditions, Hunter-Reay gained the track position necessary to earn a much-needed win, while Power finished sixth. With the lead cut to 17 points entering the MAVTV 500 season finale on the 2-mile Auto Club Speedway in Fontana, California, Power was well-positioned to earn his first championship. Those hopes took a huge hit when Power's car spun and hit the wall on lap 55 of the 250-lap race. Despite heavy damage, Team Penske got Power's car back on track long enough to gain an additional position, forcing Hunter-Reay to finish fifth or better to win the championship. Hunter-Reay ran outside of championship position for most of the race but finally moved into the top five with 21 laps remaining, eventually finishing fourth. Hunter-Reay's championship resulted in Power finishing second in the standings for the third consecutive season. Despite losing the overall championship, Power won for the third time the Mario Andretti Trophy as the 2012 road course champion.

2013 season
The 2013 season began very slowly for Power. In St. Petersburg, during a caution period, his car was run over by J. R. Hildebrand's, resulting in damage to both cars; Power was relegated to a 16th-place finish. In Barber, he finished 5th. In São Paulo, a blown engine and fire on the front stretch forced him to end his day early. He was competitive in Indianapolis, but he was not a factor in the race. He was involved in a crash in Detroit that took out several other cars, yet he remained in the top ten in points. Things started to pick up after Mid-Ohio. In Sonoma, after Scott Dixon collided with one of his crew members, Dixon was forced to make a drive-through penalty, handing the lead of the race to Will Power. He led the next 12 laps en route to his first win of 2013. He again collided with Scott Dixon in Baltimore that ended up having the bad end for Dixon. In Houston on Saturday, Will Power and Scott Dixon battled all day until lap 64, when a slow pit stop cost him the win. Scott Dixon ended up winning that day. Power's teammate, Helio Castroneves, had troubles throughout the day. On Sunday, Power avenged Dixon, as he dominated the race and won over Dixon. However, the win was overshadowed by Dixon's teammate, Dario Franchitti, crashing on the final lap. Power won the season finale in Fontana to end 2013 on a hot streak, winning 3 out of the last 5 races. He finished 4th in points for the season.

2014 season
Power won the 2014 season-opener in St. Petersburg after passing pole-sitter Takuma Sato (2017 Indianapolis 500 winner) on lap 31. However, controversy arose during the race when, with 28 laps remaining, Power seemed to slow down, bunching the field and causing Jack Hawksworth to crash into Marco Andretti.

In Long Beach, after some controversy between him and Simon Pagenaud, he finished 2nd behind Mike Conway. At Barber, mistakes cost him a shot at victory lane. In the GP of Indianapolis, a pit road penalty cost him a win. In the Indianapolis 500, he was merely a factor in the race. In the first of 2 races at Detroit, Power battled hard with Graham Rahal in the closing laps but came home with the victory for hometown Roger Penske, his team owner. The second day, his teammate won. At Texas, again a pit road penalty cost him yet another trophy, but he rallied back to finish 2nd in a dramatic finish.

In the final race at Fontana, Power drove on to finish in ninth and won his first IndyCar championship, 62 points ahead of Hélio Castroneves in the standings. Power broke down in tears as he stood on the championship podium.

2015 season

Power had a difficult 2015 IndyCar Series season but somehow managed to finish third in the championship despite several incidents, including being taken out completely without fault on consecutive ovals. Showing flashes of speed he for example took pole for the season double points finale at Sonoma. As it was, a win would have taken him ahead of eventual champion Scott Dixon, but would not have been enough to put him ahead of teammate. The duo of Power and Juan Pablo Montoya. collided during the race, ending Power's championship chances.

The vast majority of Power's success in IndyCar has been on the road and street courses, where he has often shown great speed during qualifying and races. Although he won the second leg at Texas Motor Speedway, the general inability to squeeze out ovals wins hampered Power in his first three title runs. In 2014 he won at the miler in Milwaukee and finished second at Texas, helping him to seal his first title. At the end of 2015 Power had won three oval races, one each on long, intermediate, and short ovals, with the 19 road course wins being spread out over ten wins on street courses and nine on runoff road courses, with two of those being at the hybrid airport track in Edmonton. Being more seasoned on ovals Power came close to winning the 2015 Indianapolis 500 on his eighth attempt only just losing out to teammate Juan Pablo Montoya.

2016 season 
Power missed the season-opening race at St. Petersburg due to the medical team believing that he had a concussion stemming from an accident that he had in one of the practices leading up to the race; it turned out that he did not have a concussion (it could have been an ear or sinus infection that was causing the concussion-like symptoms). Despite this setback, Power would go on to finish second in the points behind his teammate Simon Pagenaud and won 4 of the 16 races that year: the second race at Detroit (Belle Isle), Road America, Toronto, and Pocono.

2017 season 
Power's 2017 season was not as good as his 2016 season, despite not missing any races. He only finished 5th in the points and claimed three victories: Indianapolis Grand Prix, Texas, and Pocono. However, Power did claim more pole positions in 2017 – five – compared with the one he received in 2016.

2018 season

Power would emerge as a championship contender once again 2018. Despite a slow start to the season, including DNFs at Phoenix and Birmingham, Power won the 2018 IndyCar Grand Prix, scoring Team Penske's 200th win in the Series. Power won the 102nd running of the Indianapolis 500 on May 27, 2018. He also won at Gateway. He was in contention for the series title up until a late accident at Portland took him out of the championship fight.

2019 season
Power again started the season slowly but by the end of the season found his form and continued his winning ways, winning at Pocono Raceway and at the Grand Prix of Portland, increasing his streak of winning at least one race per season in IndyCar to ten seasons.

2020 season
Power again returned to Team Penske in the pandemic shortened 2020 season. Despite again starting the season slowly he found his rhythm late in the season and clinched his first victory at the Honda Indy 200 at Mid-Ohio and a second at the Harvest Grand Prix, increasing his streak of winning at least one race per season in IndyCar to eleven seasons. He finished the season by getting pole position in St. Petersburg but ultimately retired during the race.

2021 season
With the departure of Helio Castroneves to Meyer Shank Racing Power became the longest-tenured member of Penske's IndyCar stable. 2021 would be one of the toughest years of Power's career and one of the toughest for Team Penske since they returned to IndyCar. Although Power scored his best opening result to the season since 2015 and was signed to a new multi-year contract with Penske that will keep him with the team through the 2023 season he struggled frequently after committing himself to a more aggressive driving style and a shake-up of crew chiefs in the Penske IndyCar paddock. Power was nearly bumped from the 105th Indianapolis 500 before managing to survive and qualify 32nd on the grid, his lowest start to date in the race and the lowest of all the Penske drivers in 2021. Power further incurred controversy during the first race in Detroit, when he led most of the race after a red flag caused by Felix Rosenqvist only to finish twentieth with five laps to go when his car's ECU overheated and prevented a restart during another red flag incident caused by Romain Grosjean, after which he blamed IndyCar for costing him the win. In Nashville Power was involved in several wheel to wheel contact incidents with teammates Simon Pagenaud and Scott McLaughlin, one of which caused a red flag. Power won his first race of 2021 at the second round on the IMS Road Course, snapping a career-long 315-day winless streak and giving Roger Penske his first win at the speedway since he purchased the facility. Power got his first pole of the season at Gateway to bring him within four of Mario Andretti's all-time IndyCar pole position record. He ultimately finished ninth in the championship.

2022 season
2022 was a massive rebound year for Power after his difficult 2021. He started the year by scoring top five finishes in each of the first five races. He picked up his only win of the season at the final Detroit Grand Prix held on Belle Isle, redeeming himself from the previous year's misfortune. He picked up five pole positions on the season, including clinching a rare double pole position at the Iowa double header. His fifth pole position broke Mario Andretti's record for the most poles in IndyCar history. Power was one of five drivers heading into the season finale at Laguna Seca who were mathematically still in contention for the series title, holding a 20 point lead over Josef Newgarden and Scott Dixon and needing to finish no worse than third to clinch the championship. In the end Power would come out as victorious and win the 2022 Astor Cup and 2022 Indycar Series.

Sports car racing
In 2023, Power was scheduled to make his sports car racing debut, signing on to take part in the 2023 24 Hours of Daytona with SunEnergy1 Racing. However, he would be replaced by Luca Stolz just under two weeks before the event was set to take place, as he stepped away from the ride to care for his wife after she suffered complications from a recent surgery.

Personal life
Will's brother, Damien Power, is a stand-up comedian. Will plays the drums in his spare time, often playing the drums at charity events organized by IndyCar.

Will married Liz Cannon in 2010. The two met during Power's CART days when Liz joined Walker Racing as a receptionist and eventually worked in PR for the team. Their son, Beau, was born in December 2016.

In popular culture
In 2013, Power supplied the voice for the Australian anchor in the animated feature film Turbo.

Racing record

Career summary

† As he was a guest driver, Power was ineligible to score points.

‡ Team standings.

Complete Formula Renault 3.5 Series results
(key) (Races in bold indicate pole position)

American open-wheel racing results
(key)

Champ Car

IndyCar Series

 1 The Las Vegas Indy 300 was abandoned after Dan Wheldon died from injuries sustained in a 15-car crash on lap 11.

Indianapolis 500

Complete V8 Supercar results

† Not Eligible for points

Complete Bathurst 1000 results

References

External links

 
 IndyCar Driver Page

1981 births
Living people
Sportspeople from Toowoomba
Racing drivers from Queensland
A1 Team Australia drivers
Australian expatriate sportspeople in the United States
Australian Formula 3 Championship drivers
British Formula Three Championship drivers
Champ Car drivers
Formula Ford drivers
Formula Holden drivers
World Series Formula V8 3.5 drivers
Australian IndyCar Series drivers
Indianapolis 500 drivers
Indianapolis 500 winners
IndyCar Series champions
IndyCar Series drivers
Supercars Championship drivers
Fortec Motorsport drivers
Alan Docking Racing drivers
Carlin racing drivers
Walker Racing drivers
KV Racing Technology drivers
Team Penske drivers
A1 Grand Prix drivers